Tolkien Peak is a  mountain summit located in the Cadwallader Range in southwestern British Columbia, Canada. The peak is named for J. R. R. Tolkien (1892–1973), author of the novels The Hobbit and The Lord of the Rings. The names for nearby Mount Aragorn, Mount Gandalf, and Mount Shadowfax were taken from fictional characters in his books, which were read while waiting out stormy weather during the 1972 first ascents of those mountains. Precipitation runoff from the peak drains into tributaries of the Fraser River.

Climate
Based on the Köppen climate classification, Tolkien Peak is located in a subarctic climate zone of western North America. Most weather fronts originate in the Pacific Ocean, and travel east toward the Coast Mountains where they are forced upward by the range (Orographic lift), causing them to drop their moisture in the form of rain or snowfall. As a result, the Coast Mountains experience high precipitation, especially during the winter months in the form of snowfall. Temperatures can drop below −20 °C with wind chill factors below −30 °C. The months July through September offer the most favorable weather for climbing Tolkien Peak.

See also

 Geography of British Columbia
 Geology of British Columbia

References

External links
 Weather: Mountain Forecast

Two-thousanders of British Columbia
Pacific Ranges
Things named after Tolkien works
Coast Mountains